Stephen Mark Norris (born 22 September 1961) is an English former professional footballer who played in the Football League, as a forward. In the 1990–91 season, he was the highest scorer in the Fourth Division (and the second in the whole Football League), with 35 goals in total for Carlisle United and Halifax Town; having transferred from Carlisle to Halifax early in the season.

References

Sources

1961 births
Living people
Footballers from Coventry
English footballers
Association football forwards
Rugby Town F.C. players
Telford United F.C. players
Scarborough F.C. players
Notts County F.C. players
Chesterfield F.C. players
Carlisle United F.C. players
Halifax Town A.F.C. players
Worcester City F.C. players
English Football League players